Norwich Station Carriage Servicing Depot is a stabling point located in Norwich, Norfolk, England. The depot is situated on the Great Eastern Main Line and is near  Norwich Station. 

The depot code is NR.

Present 
As of 2016, the depot has no allocation. It is, instead, a stabling point for East Midlands Trains Class 158 Express Sprinters and Greater Anglia Class 153/156 Sprinters and Class 170 Turbostars.

References 

Rail transport in Norfolk
Railway depots in England